EstWin (also, EstWIN) is a project undertaken by Estonia to make 100 Mbit/s wideband internet accessible to every citizen of Estonia by 2015. The development project will be supervised by the Estonian Broadband Development Foundation, which was founded by the Ministry of Economic Affairs and Communications and the Estonian Association of Information Technology and Telecommunications (ITL) on 11 August 2009. The total cost of the EstWin project is estimated to be 6 billion Estonian kroons (384 million euros), a quarter of which is expected to come from the structural funds of European Union. This makes EstWin the biggest project ever signed between the public and private sectors of Estonia.

EstWin has been undertaken first and foremost for economic growth. Several studies have reached the conclusion that a 10% increase in the broadband connection coverage in a country will increase the gross national product by 1.2–1.5%. Development of broadband Internet connections will improve the competitiveness of regions and the country as well as improving the quality of life of people and increasing the productivity by up to 50%.

In the first stage of EstWin,  of fiber-optic cables of base network will be installed and more than 1,400 connection points will be constructed by 2012. This stage of the project will give work to 400 people and will cost an estimated 1.5 billion kroons (96 million euros), most of which will come from European structure funds. The network connection will reach the end user from the network access point either by fiber-optic or existing copper cable; in difficult cases a wireless connection will be used.

In years 2012–2015, the data transfer speeds will be increased, so that the end users connected through the fiber-optic cabling will get speeds up to 2.5 gigabits, those with copper a speed of up to a 100 megabits and those connecting through wireless at either 42 or 100 megabits per second depending on the technology.

See also
 Tiigrihüpe
 Cooperative Cyber Defence Centre of Excellence

References

External links
 Estonian Broadband Development Foundation
 Development vision of next-generation broadband network in Estonia

Internet in Estonia